Bithynia misella is a species of freshwater snail with a gill and an operculum, an aquatic gastropod mollusk in the family Bithyniidae.

Distribution 
The distribution of this species includes:
 southeastern and eastern China
 Korea
 Taiwan
 Bến Tre Province, Vietnam

Ecology 
Bithynia misella inhabits slow-moving waters such as pools, ponds and paddy fields.

Bithynia misella is the first intermediate host for:
 trematode Clonorchis sinensis

References

External links 

Bithyniidae
Gastropods described in 1884